Davy Theunis (born 28 January 1980) is a Belgian football player who plays for K.S.K. Beveren. He is a right midfielder.

References

1980 births
Living people
Belgian footballers
R.W.D.M. Brussels F.C. players
K.A.A. Gent players
K.S.K. Beveren players
Association football midfielders
Place of birth missing (living people)